Owen Giles was a professional rugby player at Northampton Saints, comfortable at any position in the back and second rows.  Having attended The Perse School, Cambridge, Giles captained his school 1st XV and was on the Great Britain Rowing talent ID program.

References

Northampton Saints players
Living people
People educated at The Perse School
Year of birth missing (living people)